Qasemabad (also Romanized as Qāsemābād; also known as Qāsemābān) is a village in Howmeh Rural District, in the Central District of Gilan-e Gharb County, Kermanshah Province, Iran. At the 2006 census, its population was 241, in 53 families. The village is populated by Kurds.

References 

Populated places in Gilan-e Gharb County
Kurdish settlements in Kermanshah Province